Königsforst is the third album by Wolfgang Voigt's Gas project. It was released in December 1998 on the Mille Plateaux label. The album is named after Königsforst recreation park, near Voigt's hometown of Köln, in which his youthful experiments with LSD provided inspiration for the entire Gas project.

The CD and vinyl pressings feature notable differences. The first songs on the vinyl's A and D sides were exclusive to this pressing until the 2016 release of Gas' second box set, Box, where they were added to the end of the CD version of Königsforst. The CD features a re-arranged track listing, with tracks B2 and D2 gaining noticeable extensions; B2 gains nearly eight minutes of runtime. The first track on CD was also released as "Oktember A" on the Oktember EP; because of this, "Oktember A" was replaced with "Tal '90" – a piece Voigt wrote under the alias of Tal – when Oktember was included in Box alongside Königsforst.

Track listing

Vinyl pressing

Compact disc pressing

Box version (2016)

References

Gas (musician) albums
1998 albums